Count Christian Frederik Holstein (1735-1799), was a Danish court official.  He was secretary of the royal Chancery from 1752, count of Ledreborg from 1763, director of the royal post office in 1762-66, chamberlain of the court of the queen, Caroline Matilda of Great Britain, in 1766-72, Overhofmarskal, chamberlain of the Danish royal court in 1772-80. He was the son of Johan Ludvig Holstein and Hedevig Vind and married Charlotte Elisabeth Henriette Holstein in 1769.

References 

 G.L. Wad, "Christian Frederik Holstein", i: C.F. Bricka (red.), Dansk Biografisk Lexikon, København: Gyldendal 1887-1905.

1735 births
1799 deaths
Danish courtiers
18th-century Danish politicians